Uppara or Sagara is a Hindu caste belonging to Kshatriya Varna and are classified as Backward Class or OBC, predominately found in the states of Andhra Pradesh, Karnataka, Telangana and Tamil Nadu. 

They are also known as Suryavamshi Sagara Kshatriyas (or sagara kshatriyas), the descendants of King Sagara of Suryavamsha.

King Sagara is one of the six legendary emperors known as Shat Chakravarthis. The story of King Sagara is narrated in Vishnu Purana.

The primary activity of Sagaras in the 19th century was preparation of salt ('uppu' in Kannada, Telugu, Malayalam and Tamil is the same, which is 'salt') so they are called upparas by profession.

History

According to Buchanan, the most important occupation of the Telugu Upparas at the beginning of the nineteenth century was the manufacture of salt.

Some members of the caste are Vaishnavites and others Saivites. They also worship various village deities, which vary according to the place of residence.

The one man commission constituted by the Government of Andhra Pradesh, chaired by Sri Anantha Raman in its report in 1968 made certain observations and recommendations regarding the Uppara or Sagara community. Some of the points mentioned in the report are as follows:
Uppara or Sagara is a caste of workers engaged in agriculture.
They also engaged in manufacturing salt.
When private manufacture of salt was forbidden during the British rule, the people of the community turned to other occupations. The Uppara seem to have made little shifts in an agrarian context. Losing their caste based occupation as salt makers, they mainly did agriculture.
 The members of Sagara (Uppara) community are the descendants of Emperor Sagara of Suryavamsha spread throughout the Country and all over the world. He is one of the six legendary emperors known as ‘Shat Chakravarthis’. The story of King Sagara is narrated in Vishnu Purana.

Demographics
The "Chinnappa Reddy Report (1990)" indicates that the Uppara make up about 1.18 percent of the population of Karnataka.

References

Social groups of Tamil Nadu
Indian castes
Telugu society
Social groups of Andhra Pradesh
Social groups of Karnataka